Newark is a city serving as the county seat of Licking County, Ohio, United States,  east of Columbus, at the junction of the forks of the Licking River. The population was 49,934 at the 2020 census, making it the 18th largest city in Ohio. It is part of the Columbus metropolitan area.

It is the site of much of the Newark Earthworks, a major ancient complex built by the Hopewell culture. The Great Circle portion and additional burial mounds are located in the neighboring city of Heath, Ohio. This complex has been designated as a National Historic Landmark and is operated as a state park by the Ohio History Connection.

History

Cultures of indigenous peoples lived along the river valleys for thousands of years before European contact. From more than two thousand years ago, 100 AD to 500 AD, people of the Hopewell culture transformed the area of Newark and Heath. They built many earthen mounds and enclosures, creating the single largest earthwork complex in the Ohio River Valley. The Newark Earthworks, designated a National Historic Landmark, have been preserved to document and interpret the area's significant ancient history. The earthworks cover several square miles and about 206 acres. This is operated as a state park by the Ohio History Connection.

The Octagon alone is large enough to contain four Roman Coliseums. The Great Pyramid of Giza in Egypt would fit precisely within Observatory Circle. The even larger -diameter Newark Great Circle, located in Heath, is the largest circular earthwork in the Americas. The -high walls surround a -deep moat. At the entrance, the walls and moat are of greater and more impressive dimensions. 

Contemporary archaeogeodesy and archaeoastronomy researchers have demonstrated that the Hopewell and other prehistoric cultures had advanced scientific understandings which they used to create their earthworks for astronomical observations, markings and celebrations. Researchers analyzed the placements, alignments, dimensions, and site-to-site interrelationships of the Hopewell earthworks to understand what had been done. Today, the Ohio Historical Society preserves the Great Circle Earthworks in a public park near downtown Newark, called Mound Builders Park (or the Newark Earthworks) located at 99 Cooper Ave, Newark, Ohio. The area of the Octagon Earthworks had been leased to a country club, but new arrangements in 1997 provide for more public access to it. Later American Indian tribes inhabiting the area at the time of European contact were distant descendants of the Hopewell peoples.

European-American settlement
  After exploration by traders and trappers in earlier centuries, the first European-American settlers arrived in 1802, led by Gen. William C. Schenck. He named the new village after his New Jersey hometown.

Nineteenth-century investment in infrastructure resulted in growth in the town after it was linked to major transportation and trade networks. On July 4, 1825, Governors Clinton of New York and Morrow of Ohio dug the first shovelfuls of dirt for the Ohio and Erie Canal project, at the Licking Summit near Newark, Ohio. On April 11, 1855, Newark became a stop along the Pittsburgh, Cincinnati, Chicago and St. Louis Railroad that was built to connect Pittsburgh to Chicago and St. Louis. On April 16, 1857, the Central Ohio Railroad connected Newark west to Columbus, and later Newark maintained a station on the Baltimore and Ohio Railroad.

The Heisey Glass Company started in Newark in 1895. The factory operated there for 62 years, until the company's demise in 1957 due to changing tastes. The National Heisey Glass Museum, operated by the Heisey Collectors of America, Inc., is located on Sixth Street in Newark.

In 1909, The Arcade was opened. Modeled after innovative European retail buildings, it became one of Newark's first successful retail emporiums. Later versions of buildings that contained a variety of shops indoors became known as shopping malls. At , the Arcade is one-third the size of an average modern Wal-Mart.

Geography
Newark is located at  (40.063014, −82.416779).

Demographics

In terms of population, Newark, Ohio is the second-largest Newark in the United States, after Newark, New Jersey. Newark, Ohio is part of the Columbus, Ohio metropolitan area. The median income for a household in the city was $52,570, with 16.8% of the population below the poverty line.

2010 census
As of the census of 2010, there were 47,573 people, 19,840 households, and 12,057 families residing in the city. The racial makeup of the city was 92.8% White, 3.3% African American, 0.3% Native American, 0.6% Asian, 0.3% from other races, and 2.6% from two or more races. Hispanic or Latino of any race were 1.2% of the population.

There were 19,840 households, of which 30.8% had children under the age of 18 living with them, 40.7% were married couples living together, 14.8% had a female householder with no husband present, 5.3% had a male householder with no wife present, and 39.2% were non-families. 31.9% of all households were made up of individuals, and 12.3% had someone living alone who was 65 years of age or older. The average household size was 2.35 and the average family size was 2.94.

The median age in the city was 37.3 years. 24% of residents were under the age of 18; 9.9% were between the ages of 18 and 24; 25.6% were from 25 to 44; 26% were from 45 to 64; and 14.5% were 65 years of age or older. The gender makeup of the city was 47.8% male and 52.2% female.

Business

Newark is the site of several major manufacturers. Holophane, founded in 1898, is one of the world's oldest manufacturers of lighting-related products. The main factory of Owens Corning Fiberglass is also located in Newark. State Farm Insurance has Regional Headquarters here. The Park National Bank Corporation is headquartered in downtown Newark.

Several industrial parks have been developed and house such major companies as Kaiser Aluminum, Dow Chemical Company, General Electric, Covestro, Boeing, THK, Harry & David, Communicolor, Diebold, Anomatic, International Paper, and Tamarack Farms Dairy. Longaberger, a major basket-maker, had their new corporate headquarters in Newark designed as a gigantic "medium market basket," their most popular model.

The main shopping center in the area is the Indian Mound Mall, located in nearby Heath. The mall is named for the internationally known, ancient complex called the Newark Earthworks, built 2,000 years ago by the Hopewell culture of central Ohio. It is a National Historic Landmark and major elements of the earthworks are located less than a mile away from the shopping mall named for them.

Education
Newark City School District serves the city of Newark. Newark High School consists of nearly 2,000 students and competes at the OHSAA D1 level. Newark High School has a storied tradition in Academics and Sports, as well as Performing Arts. Newark High School has won 4 OHSAA Basketball titles (36', 38', 43', 08') and 3 AP Football titles. The Pride of Newark Marching Band has made an unprecedented 42 consecutive years to the OMEA state finals. The Pride has earned a superior rating at State Marching Band finals 31 years, including 4 straight seasons (2015, ‘16, ‘17, ‘18). The Newark High School Sinfonia, under the direction of Susan Larson, tied for first runner-up at the National Orchestra Cup in New York City on April 5, 2009. The Sinfonia was featured in a front-page article of the April 14, 2009, edition of The New York Times, and received an invitation to the White House in the fall of 2009. Their Concert Choir recently sang in Italy and was sponsored by Disney. Under the direction of Kimberly & Michael Wigglesworth, the choir has qualified for OMEA Choir state Finals for the past 15 years. 

A regional campus of Ohio State University is also located in the city. The Ohio State University at Newark, founded in 1957, schools over 2,800 students and is the most diverse campus in the Ohio State system. Today, under the leadership of Dean and Director William MacDonald, the campus features eleven buildings, including a recreation center and two residence halls. It offers Associate of Arts degrees, as well as Bachelor of Arts degrees in seven majors and master's degrees in education and social work. It also serves as a doorway to over 200 majors on the Ohio State University campus in Columbus. The Newark Campus shares its facilities with a two-year technical college, COTC (Central Ohio Technical College). Under the leadership of President Bonnie Coe, it serves some 3,000 other students in 45 certificate and associate degree programs.

Newark is also home to a number of private religious schools, including St. Francis de Sales School, Blessed Sacrament School and Newark Catholic High School. C-TEC (Career and Technology Education Centers of Licking County) offers high school and adult programs.

Newark has a public library, a branch of the Licking County Library System.

Transportation
Licking County provided demand-response public transportation under the name Licking County Transit. GoBus' Columbus-Wooster route provides service to Newark.

Climate

Notable people

 Gary A. Braunbeck, horror author
 John J. Brice, United States Navy officer and Uniited States Commissioner of Fish and Fisheries (1896–1898)
 John Clem, one of the youngest soldiers in United States Army
 Mike Collins, football player for NFL's Detroit Lions and St. Louis Rams
 Katharine Coman, economic historian, professor at Wellesley College; credited with developing the field of industrial history; was the first female professor to teach statistics in the US
 Woody English, MLB player for Chicago Cubs
 Jon Hendricks, jazz singer
 Derek Holland, MLB starting pitcher for San Francisco Giants, Chicago White Sox, Texas Rangers, Detroit Tigers
 Che Jones, college basketball player; jersey number retired by Ohio State-Newark in 2001
 Rob Kelly, five-year NFL pro with the New Orleans Saints and New England Patriots
 Roman Mars, host and producer of 99% Invisible
 Andy Merrill, the voice of Brak
 Jerrie Mock, first woman to fly solo around the world
 Bruce Mozert, photographer
 Wayne Newton, singer, actor, Las Vegas Strip entertainer; raised in Newark
 Kathi Norris, writer and television presenter
 Henry Putnam, Wisconsin state senator
 Edward James Roye, 5th President of Liberia
 Fred Schaus, Hall of Fame head coach of NBA's Los Angeles Lakers, Purdue and West Virginia
Marshall Sprague, journalist
 William Stanbery, U.S. Congressman
 G. David Thompson, investment banker, industrialist, and modern art collector
 Jim Tyrer, professional football player for Kansas City Chiefs and Washington Redskins
 Jeff Uhlenhake, 12-year NFL pro with Miami Dolphins, Washington Redskins and New Orleans Saints
 Geoffrey C. Ward, historian and writer
 Clarence Hudson White, early photographer, member of modernist "Photo Secessionist" group
 Michael Z. Williamson, science fiction author
 Charles R. Woods, Civil War general
 William Burnham Woods, U.S. Supreme Court Associate Justice

References in culture

 Isaac Asimov refers to the Newark Earthworks in a short story.
 Robert Silverberg's novella Born With The Dead is set partly in Newark, and refers to the Great Circle and Octagon Mounds
 Parts of The Tales of Alvin Maker series of novels by Orson Scott Card refer to the earthworks.
 Gary A. Braunbeck sets much of his fiction in Cedar Hill, a city based on Newark.
 Parts of James Frey's highly successful book, A Million Little Pieces, are based in and around Newark.

See also
 Newark Earthworks
 Blackhand Gorge State Nature Preserve
 Dawes Arboretum
 Home Building Association Bank
 Flint Ridge State Memorial
 Roper (company)

References

Bibliography
 Smucker, Isaac (1807-1894): Recollections of Newark, Ohio Archæological and Historical Society Publications: Volume 20 [1911], pp. 240–247.

External links

 City of Newark, Ohio
 Community resource website for Newark, Ohio
 OSU-Newark and COTC
 

 
Cities in Ohio
Cities in Licking County, Ohio
County seats in Ohio
Populated places established in 1802
1802 establishments in the Northwest Territory